Roti (in English known as chapati) is a round flatbread native to the Indian subcontinent. It is popular in India, Sri Lanka, Pakistan, Nepal, Bangladesh, Maldives, Myanmar, Malaysia, Indonesia, Singapore, Thailand, Guyana, Suriname, Jamaica, Trinidad and Tobago, Mauritius, and Fiji. It is made from stoneground whole wheat flour, traditionally known as gehu ka atta, and water that is combined into a dough. Roti is consumed in many countries worldwide. Its defining characteristic is that it is unleavened. Naan from the Indian subcontinent, by contrast, is a yeast-leavened bread, as is kulcha. Like breads around the world, roti is a staple accompaniment to other foods.

Etymology
The word roti is derived from the Sanskrit word (roṭikā), meaning "bread".

Preparation 
Roti dough may be rolled out with a rolling pin to create flat, round pieces. This may be done on a circular, flat board called a roti board.

Variants

Indian subcontinent

Many variations of flatbreads and roti are found in many cultures across the globe, from the Indian subcontinent to Africa to Oceania to the Malay Peninsula to the Americas. The roti is a traditional flatbread from the Indian subcontinent. It is normally eaten with cooked vegetables or curries; it can be called a carrier for them. It is made most often from wheat flour, cooked on a flat or slightly concave iron griddle called a tawa. Traditionally, rotis have also been made from the flour of millet, maize, jowar, bajra, and even rice. Tandoori roti is cooked by sticking the flattened dough to the inside wall of a tandoor oven, where it bakes quickly at a high temperature. Chapatis are made of whole-wheat flour known as atta, mixed into dough with water, edible oil and optional salt in a mixing utensil called a parat, and is cooked on a tava (flat skillet). It is known as phulka in Punjabi and Saraiki, and maani in Sindhi.

Sri Lanka
In Sri Lanka, there is a variant of roti called pol roti (coconut roti), made of wheat flour, and/or kurakkan flour, and scraped coconut. Sometimes, chopped green chilis and onion are added to the mixture before cooking. These are usually thicker and harder than other roti types. They are usually eaten with curries, or some types of sambol or lunu miris and considered a main meal rather than a supplement.

Another variety of roti popular in Sri Lanka is kottu roti, which is made up of  paratha or godamba roti, These are cut into small pieces, small in size and rectangular or square in shape. Then on a square heating pan, vegetables and onions are fried. Eggs, cooked meat, or fish are added to fried vegetables and heated for a few minutes. Finally, the pieces of cut paratha are added. These are chopped and mixed by repeated pounding using heavy iron blades/spatula, the sound of which can be heard from a long distance. Depending upon what ingredients are used, the variations are vegetable, egg, chicken, beef, mutton, and fish kottu roti. It is sometimes prepared and served as a fast food dish.

Godamba roti is another variety found in Sri Lanka. Plain godamba roti is eaten with curry or it can also be wrapped around a savory filling.

Caribbean
Roti is eaten widely across the Caribbean, especially in countries with large Indo-Caribbean populations such as Trinidad and Tobago,  Guyana, Suriname, and Jamaica. Originally brought to the islands by indentured laborers from the Indian subcontinent, roti has become a popular staple in the culturally rich cuisines of these countries. In the Caribbean, roti is commonly eaten as an accompaniment to various curries and stews. The traditional way of eating roti is to break the roti by hand, using it to sop up sauce and pieces of meat from the curry. However, in the Caribbean, the term roti may refer to both the flatbread (roti) itself and the more popular street food item, in which the roti is folded around a savory filling in the form of a wrap.

The roti wrap is the commercialization of roti and curry together as a fast-food or street-food item in the Caribbean. This wrap form of roti originated in southern Trinidad. It was first created in the mid-1940s by Sackina Karamath, who later founded Hummingbird Roti Shop in San Fernando, Trinidad and Tobago. The wrap was convenient, as the meal could be eaten faster and while on the go, as well as keeping one's hands from getting dirty. In Trinidad and Tobago, various wrapped roti are served, including chicken, conch, goat, beef, and shrimp. Vegetables can also be added including potato, pumpkin, and spinach as well a variety of local condiments, with pepper sauce (hot sauce) and mango chutney being the most popular. The roti wrap quickly gained popularity across the island and spread throughout the rest of the Caribbean.  The wrap is now simply referred to as a roti or just roti.  The growth in popularity has recently led to referring to the flatbread itself (roti) that surrounds the filling as a "roti skin" or "roti shell", a practice that is now common in both restaurants and commercial companies. Various types of roti are eaten throughout the West Indies. They are most prominently featured in the diets of people in Trinidad and Tobago, Guyana, and Suriname. Caribbean-style roti is primarily made from wheat flour, baking powder, salt, and water, and cooked on a tawa. Certain rotis are also made with ghee or butter.

Trinidad and Tobago

Guyana

Dosti roti is common in Guyana. A small amount of fat is placed in each piece of dough before it is rolled out to make the roti softer. Usually, vegetable oil is used, but butter, or margarine can also be used. Ghee is not used in everyday cooking, but is used on special occasions, especially amongst Hindus. The roti is usually clapped by hand or beaten a bit, hot off the tava, so it softens but does not break.
 A good roti in Guyana is very soft, with layers (almost like pastry layers if possible), which remains whole.
 The type of roti is determined by what is placed in the dough before it is rolled out. Various types include dhalpuri, aloo (potato) roti, and even sugar (to keep the kids busy, while the mother finishes cooking).
 In Guyana, a rolled-out, thin, flat dough like a roti that is deep-fried in ghee is called a puri. Therefore, a dhalpuri is not really a puri.
 Another item prepared like roti is bake or bakes or floats. A Guyanese or Trinidadian fry bake seems to be more similar to an Indian puri. A bake is made with butter or margarine and has a different ratio of flour to fat. It is made much quicker than roti and is usually made in the mornings. Dough is rolled out and cut into shapes or rolled into small rounds. Guyanese bakes are fried, but bakes from other parts of the West Indies can be baked in an oven. Bakes are usually paired with a quick fry-up for breakfast or dinner, stewed saltfish, or eggs ("western" style, with onions, tomatoes, green peppers). Bakes are also made in other parts of the West Indies, including Trinidad, Barbados, and St. Vincent. In Trinidad and Tobago, a "bake and shark" is a popular street-food sandwich in which fried shark is placed between two halves of a sliced bake with local condiments. Pepper sauce, shado beni, garlic sauce, tamarind, and mango chutney are most common, as well as lettuce, tomato, and cucumber for fillers.

Suriname
In Suriname, roti refers mainly to dhalpuri or aloo puri. It is most often eaten with curried chicken. As in Trinidad and the West Indies, roti can also refer to the stuffed roti wrap. This dish is usually eaten out of hand. Due to a mass emigration of Indian Surinamese in the 1970s, roti became a popular take-out dish in the Netherlands. It usually includes chicken curry, potatoes, a boiled egg, and various vegetables, most notably the kousenband or yardlong bean. Another variation includes shrimp and aubergine. The meat with gravy, potatoes, egg, and yardlong beans are served side by side on a plate, with the aloo puri folded in fours on top.

Southeast Asia

In Indonesia and Malaysia, the term encompasses all forms of bread, including Western-style bread, as well as the traditional Indian breads.

In Thailand, โรตี is a popular street food that can be eaten as a dessert or as a side dish. Some Thai curries can also be accompanied with a side of roti, primarily Southern Thai curries. 

In Cambodia, រ៉ូទី is a dessert that is sold as street food. It is similar to both a crêpe and paratha.

South Africa
Roti was initially introduced to South Africa by Indian migrants during the 19th century, and subsequently became incorporated into Durban cuisine. It is widely eaten by the Indian communities living in South Africa, and is either eaten as a flat bread or a wrap with locally made curries.

Mauritius
Similarly as with other countries that were part of the Indian diaspora, roti was introduced to Mauritius by Indian migrants/indentured labourers during the 19th century, and has since been a staple of Mauritian cuisine and a common street food. Roti generally refers to farata (a local pronunciation of paratha), a pancake made of wheat flour and water; other variants include dholl puri, which is layered, and stuffed with boiled and ground dal/split peas, and ti puri, a smaller roti that is fried and usually served with seven different curries.

Iran
In Iran, the two variants of roti are called khaboos and lavash.  These two breads (the former of which is almost exactly prepared like Indian roti) are quite similar to other rotis.

North America
Roti shops are now abundant in Trinidad and Tobago, Guyana, Suriname, Jamaica, the United States, Canada, the United Kingdom, and the Netherlands. Owing to Canada's considerable immigrant populations from both South Asia and the Caribbean, roti and its variants are popular there. As Indo-Caribbeans moved to North American cities such as Toronto, New York City, Miami, Los Angeles, and Montreal, they exported with them the wrapped version of roti. A distinct Toronto offering is the "East Indian roti", a variation on the stuffed roti from the West Indies.

See also

 Bhatura
 Jolada rotti
 Kulcha
 Luchi
 Tortilla

Notes

References

 
Indian cuisine
North Indian cuisine
Indian breads
Bihari cuisine
Uttar Pradeshi cuisine
Punjabi cuisine
Sindhi cuisine
Nepalese cuisine
Pashtun cuisine
Balochi cuisine
Kashmiri cuisine
Fijian cuisine
Jamaican cuisine
Mauritian cuisine
Flatbreads
Pakistani breads
Unleavened breads
Bengali cuisine
Punjabi words and phrases
Gujarati cuisine
Trinidad and Tobago cuisine
Indian inventions
Guyanese cuisine
Surinamese cuisine
Indo-Caribbean cuisine
Bangladeshi cuisine
Sri Lankan breads
Indonesian breads
Malaysian breads